Daniel Francis Fouts (born June 10, 1951) is an American former professional football player who was a quarterback for the San Diego Chargers of the National Football League (NFL) throughout his 15-season career (1973–1987). After a relatively undistinguished first five seasons in the league, Fouts came to prominence as the on-field leader during the Chargers' Air Coryell period. He led the league in passing every year from 1979 to 1982, passing for over 4,000 yards in the first three of these—no previous quarterback had posted consecutive 4,000-yard seasons. Fouts was voted a Pro Bowler six times, first-team All-Pro twice, and Offensive Player of the Year in 1982. He was named a member of the NFL 1980s All-Decade Team, and elected to the Pro Football Hall of Fame in 1993, his first year of eligibility.

Fouts played for the Oregon Ducks in college, breaking numerous records and later being inducted into the Oregon Sports Hall of Fame and the University of Oregon Hall of Fame. He was a third-round draft pick of the Chargers in 1973, brought in to back up veteran Johnny Unitas. Fouts struggled during his first three season in the league while playing for losing teams. His form began to improve in 1976, when Bill Walsh spent a year in San Diego as his offensive coordinator, but discontentment over the direction of the team and the restrictions of the NFL's free agency rules led Fouts to refuse to play through the majority of 1977.

Early in 1978, Don Coryell became the new head coach of the Chargers and installed the pass-oriented offensive scheme that would become known as Air Coryell. Fouts, given license to throw with an unprecedented frequency, produced record-breaking numbers during the rest of his career. He led the NFL in passing yards four straight years from 1979 to 1982 (still a record), and became the first player in history to throw for 4,000 yards in three consecutive seasons, breaking the NFL single-season record for passing yards each time. He set career records for the most 300-yard games and 400-yard games. Fouts was rewarded with six Pro Bowl selections (1979–1982, 1983, 1985) and four All-Pro selections (first team in 1979 and 1982, second team in 1980 and 1985). In the strike-shortened 1982 season, he passed for 2,883 yards in only nine games, winning the AP Offensive Player of the Year and PFWA NFL MVP honors.

Fouts led the Chargers to three consecutive AFC West division titles (1979–1981) and a further playoff appearance in 1982. He was the winning quarterback in the Epic in Miami game, breaking a playoff record with 433 passing yards. The Chargers advanced to the AFC Championship Game twice during his career, but never reached the Super Bowl. Fouts is widely considered among the best quarterbacks in NFL history to never reach a Super Bowl.

Fouts was a color analyst for NFL games on CBS television and Westwood One radio. He is the son of Bay Area Radio Hall of Famer Bob Fouts.

Early life and high school career 
Dan Fouts was born in San Francisco on June 10, 1951, to Julie and Bob Fouts, the fourth of five children. His father was a sports broadcaster who commentated on games for the San Francisco 49ers of the National Football League (NFL) for over 20 years. As a child, Dan acted as a stat-keeper for Bob and worked for the 49ers as a ballboy. One of his first sporting heroes was John Brodie, the 49ers' starting quarterback of that time. When, at the age of 11, Fouts asked his parents' permission to play football, they told him that he would have to be a quarterback, as he had shown a good throwing arm while playing Little League baseball. He played Pop Warner football for the Drake Junior Pirates, where his coach described him as an "outstanding quarterback" in 1964.

Fouts attended Marin Catholic High School, located just north of San Francisco in Kentfield, California, for his two first years, and started some games as a sophomore in the fall of 1966. While he temporarily lost the starting job after play described as "extremely jittery" by a local newspaper, an end of season report from the same paper stated that he should improve with better protection. Fouts, playing on an 0–6 team, finished the season with nine interceptions and only one touchdown. He also played varsity basketball as a forward. Fouts transferred to St. Ignatius College Preparatory (San Francisco) for his final two years of high school. In 1967, St. Ignatius were champions of the West Catholic Athletic League with a 6–0 record, and Fouts was named to the WCAL All-Star first-team. He nearly reversed his touchdown to interceptions ratio, with 16 touchdowns and two interceptions. St. Ignatius went 5–1 in Fouts' senior year; he passed much less as his team focused more on their running game.

Statistics

College career 
Fouts was somewhat of an unknown when he accepted a scholarship offer from the University of Oregon to play for the Ducks in Eugene. He started for the freshman team during his first year there (1969). In 1970, he began the season on the bench behind veteran quarterback/punter Tom Blanchard. In the opening game, a 31–24 victory over California, Fouts came off the bench and completed 12 of 19 passes for 166 yards and two touchdowns, including the game-winner in the final two minutes. Fouts and Blanchard combined to set a new Pacific-8 Conference record with 424 passing yards. After another relief appearance the following week, Fouts got his first chance to start in Week 3, going up against Stanford and their quarterback Jim Plunkett with Blanchard out injured. Fouts and Plunkett would contest the AFC championship game ten years later. Plunkett's Stanford won this first meeting 33–10, though Fouts set school records with 27 completions, 51 attempts and 271 yards. Two weeks later, Fouts threw the winning 15-yard touchdown with 30 seconds to play, and Oregon beat UCLA 41–40. In Week 5, Fouts tied a school record with four touchdowns in an easy win over Idaho; he repeated the feat against Air Force three weeks later, while setting an Oregon single-game passing yards record (396) that would last until 1989. Fouts finished the season ranked second in the Pacific-8 Conference for completions, completion percentage and passing touchdowns (behind Plunkett each times) and third in passing yards, though his 24 interceptions were tied for most in the conference. He passed for 16 touchdowns while running for 4 more, and his season total of 2,390 passing yards was an Oregon record that stood until 1986. UPI named him an honorable mention in their season-ending all-coast team.

Fouts entered his junior year (1971) as an established and highly-rated starter. That season, he had over 100 fewer attempts than the previous season, in part because of the form of running back Ahmad Rashad, who led the Pacific-8 in rushing attempts and yards. Fouts was third in the conference in attempts, completions and passing yards. He posted an improved touchdowns to interceptions ratio of 9–11, with his interceptions total being the lowest among Pacific-8 quarterbacks who played in every game. In 1972, with Rashad having graduated, Fouts again became the main focus of the offense. He broke the Oregon record for career passing yardage in an early-season win over Arizona, but his team struggled for much of the season, conceding 60 points in consecutive games and going into their finale against with a 3–7 record. In his last college game, Fouts threw a 65-yard touchdown, and Oregon beat Oregon State for the first time in nine years. Fouts was named to the All-Pac-8 team, and finished second in the conference behind Stanford's Mike Boryla in attempts, completions, touchdowns and interceptions. Fouts had less help up front, and his passing to receiver Greg Sprecht accounted for most of the Ducks offense during a trying season. At the time, Fouts ranked second in conference history in career passing and total offense behind Plunkett. He set 19 Oregon records, including those for career passing yardage (5,995) and total offense (5,871), and was inducted into the university's hall of fame in 1992.

Statistics

Professional career

1973–1975: Early struggles 
Fouts was selected in the third round of the 1973 NFL Draft by the San Diego Chargers, using the 64th overall pick. The sixth quarterback taken in the draft, he was brought in to back up his childhood idol, Johnny Unitas, who had joined the Chargers during the offseason after 17 years with the Baltimore Colts. Fouts broke his collarbone playing in the Coaches All-America Game, and then held out for more money before signing with the Chargers. He missed the first three preseason games while still recovering from his injury. Unitas soon picked up a career-ending shoulder injury, causing Fouts to see extensive action as a rookie. His first appearance came in Week 4, entering a game at Pittsburgh at the start of the second half, with the Chargers trailing 38–0. Fouts led three touchdown drives, and the game finished 38–21; His first career touchdown pass was a 13-yarder to Jerry LeVias. The following week, Fouts made his first start, completing 12 of 30 passes for 183 yards, two touchdowns and an interception as the Chargers lost 27–17 to Oakland, earning positive reviews for his performance. He struggled in his next game, intercepted four times during a 41–0 home loss to Atlanta. By the end of the 1973 season, Fouts was 0–5–1 as a starter, with six touchdowns against 13 interceptions, while completing fewer than 45% of his passes. His passer rating of 46.0 was well below the league average of 64.9.

Unitas announced his retirement before the 1974 season, paving the way for Fouts to stake a claim to the starting job. He started the first eleven games, before a broken thumb ended his season. Fouts went 3–8 in those games, posted an improved passer rating of 61.4; half of his season total of 8 touchdown passes came in a single Week 8 game with Cleveland, completing 12 passes of 21 for 333 yards as the Chargers won 36–35. While Fouts again finished the season with a completion percentage below 50%, his yards per completion of 15.1 led the NFL.

Fouts increased his completion percentage in 1975 (to 54.4%), but threw only two touchdowns against 10 interceptions, while going 2–7 as a starter. In a Week 3 game with the Raiders, Fouts completed 3 of 13 passes for 29 yards, no touchdowns and two interceptions, while getting sacked five times for 51 yards; he finished the game with a passer rating of zero, the only such rating of his 15-year career. Fouts was booed when he was announced at the start of that game, and struggled with injuries throughout the season (first a sore ankle, then a concussion), though his replacements also struggled.

1976–1977: Improvement and holdout 
In 1976, the Chargers brought in Bill Walsh from Cincinnati to be their offensive coordinator. He stayed in the post for a season before moving on to be the head coach at Stanford. Fouts would later say, "Walsh really got me into the position to be an effective quarterback". Fouts also gained a new wide receiver when the Chargers traded for seven-year veteran Charlie Joiner. Joiner went on to spend 11 years with Fouts in San Diego, with over 9,000 receiving yards and 47 touchdowns as a Charger. Fouts later described the receiver as a security blanket, saying: "I don’t think he ever dropped any, at least any that were thrown that he could catch."

Fouts began the 1976 season by throwing six touchdown and no interceptions in the first three games, all wins. In a Week 3, 43–24 victory over Don Coryell's St. Louis Cardinals, Fouts went 15 of 18 for 259 yards, 4 touchdowns and no interceptions. Fouts was the league's No. 1 rated passer at that stage, though the defenses he had faced were not highly rated. The remainder of the season did not go as well for the Chargers, who were shut out four times and finished 6–8, or for Fouts, who started thirteen games and played in all fourteen, despite fans calling for backup Clint Longley to have more playing time. Nonetheless, he finished with new career highs in passing yards (2,535), completion percentage (57.8%), and touchdowns (14); he threw 15 interceptions, at a new career-low interception percentage of 4.2%. Fouts finished with a passer rating of 75.4 for the season, above the league average of 67.0. San Diego sports journalist Jack Murphy described 1976 as a year of "much growth" for Fouts, and the departing Walsh predicted that he would have a fine career in the league.

San Diego acquired quarterback James Harris from the Los Angeles Rams during the offseason, with head coach Tommy Prothro stating that he wanted depth at the injury-prone position. Harris's contract was speculated to pay him approximately $170,000, compared to $82,500 for Fouts. The following month, Fouts was one of 17 players testifying against the NFL in an antitrust settlement. Fouts expressed a desire to leave San Diego, and complained at a new collective bargaining agreement; the agreement meant the Chargers had only to match the offer of another team to prevent him from leaving. There was speculation that Fouts was disgruntled due to Harris's signing and contract, but Fouts himself said that he wanted to play in a Super Bowl, and that the Chargers were not of that caliber; he stated that he would retire if he was not allowed to leave San Diego. Fouts refused to report to training camp, During the lengthy holdout that followed, Fouts attacked Prothro as "the farthest thing from a head coach you'll ever find ... he's snowing people into thinking he knows what he's doing."

On November 15, the NFL grievance committee rejected an attempt by Fouts to become a free agent. Chargers Owner Gene Klein said that Fouts had been given bad advice by his lawyer, and would be welcomed back to the team. Fouts reported to the team on November 17, 125 days late, having accrued $62,500 in fines.
He returned to a 5–5 team who had recently lost Harris to injury, and started from Week 11 onwards. Fouts threw 4 touchdowns and 1 interception in the first two games, both wins, then no touchdowns and five interceptions in the following two, both defeats.

1978–1986: Leader of Air Coryell

1978 season 

The Chargers drafted wide receiver John Jefferson in the first round of the 1978 draft, and he caught two touchdown passes from Fouts in his debut, as the Chargers beat Seattle in Week 1 of the 1978 season. San Diego lost their next three and Prothro resigned, to be replaced by Coryell. He installed the explosive offensive system that would become known as Air Coryell during an eight-year reign as Chargers head coach, led on the field by Fouts.

San Diego lost three of Coryell's first four games, slipping to a 2–6 record at the midway point of the season. They won their next four games in a row; In the third of these, Fouts threw a 14-yard touchdown to Jefferson as time expired in overtime, to beat Kansas City 29–23. Fouts missed the return match with the Chiefs through injury, and the Chargers were shut out. He returned for the final three games, winning all of them to give him seven consecutive victories as a starter; he passed frequently during these three games, throwing for over 900 yards and 9 touchdowns, while the Chargers averaged over 40 points per game. Fouts earned praise for his performances during the strong finish.

The Chargers finished 9–7, missing the playoffs. As a team, they led the league in passing yards. Fouts himself was sixth in the NFL with 2,999 passing yards, first in yards per attempt (7.9), fourth in completion percentage (58.8%) and touchdowns (24), and third in passer rating (83.0). He threw more touchdowns than interceptions for the first time in his career (24–20), and combined frequently with Jefferson, who led the league with 13 touchdown receptions. That season, the NFL had adopted a rule change to free up the passing game, prohibiting defenders from making contact with receivers past five yards from the line of scrimmage.

1979 season 
The Chargers finished 12–4 in 1979, winning the AFC West and reaching the playoffs for the first time since 1965. The offseason featured the arrival of another major target for Fouts. Tight end Kellen Winslow, the Chargers' 1st-round pick in the 1979 Draft, missed half of his rookie season with a broken leg, but played a huge role in the Charger offense from 1980 through to a major knee injury in 1984. Winslow is credited with revolutionizing the tight end position through his pass-catching ability.

Fouts started every game in 1979. From Week 6 to Week 9, he set an NFL record with four consecutive 300-yard games, although the Chargers only won two of these. Fouts later posted three consecutive passer ratings of over 100. San Diego ended the regular season as both their AFC West champions and the No. 1 seed in the AFC, as Fouts reached the playoffs for the first time, seven years into his career.

Fouts finished the season with 4,082 yards passing, breaking Joe Namath's record of 4,007, albeit from two extra games. He led the league in completion percentage with 62.6%, and ranked third with a passer rating of 82.6. He posted an even ratio of touchdowns to interceptions (24–24). Fouts tied another Namath record with six total 300-yard games. In the end of season awards, he finished second behind Earl Campbell for both AP NFL MVP (outvoted 34–27) and AP Offensive Player of the Year (outvoted 39–34), while being named to the AFC Pro Bowl and 1st-team All-Pro teams. Both Jefferson and Joiner had 1,000-yard receiving seasons, two of the twelve players to reach that milestone league-wide.

San Diego's return to the playoffs ended in disappointment, losing 17–14 at home to the wildcard Houston Oilers. Fouts completed 25 of 47 passes for 333 yards, no touchdowns and five interceptions. Fouts said after the game, "We just made too many mistakes, that's all. We didn't play very well and they did." It was revealed after the game that Houston defensive coordinator Ed Biles had managed to crack the code San Diego used to signal their offensive plays to Fouts, giving them prior warning of the coming plays and potentially accounting in part for Fouts' struggles.

1980 season 
San Diego repeated as division champions in 1980 with an 11–5 record. Fouts had an eventful game in the Week 2 matchup with Oakland. He turned the ball over on five consecutive possessions in the 3rd quarter, with four interceptions and a fumble that was run back for a touchdown, but eventually threw a 24-yard touchdown to Joiner in overtime as the Chargers won 30–24. Fouts finished the game with 29 completions from 44 attempts for 387 yards, with 3 touchdowns and 5 interceptions. The 387 yards were a new single-game franchise record for the Chargers. Fouts himself would break the record once more four weeks later, with 388 yards in a 38–24 loss to the Raiders; the following week, he broke it again, this time passing for 444 yards in a 44–7 victory over the Giants. This last total would prove to be the joint-most of his career. San Diego and Oakland had a tight race for the AFC West title, which the Chargers eventually edged on tiebreakers.

For the second consecutive season, Fouts broke the passing yardage record, finishing with 4,715 yards, over 500 ahead of his nearest rival. This time, he also broke Namath's yards per game record by averaging 294.7. His marks for attempts (589) and completions (348) were NFL records, and he posted a new personal best with 30 touchdowns (against 24 interceptions) and with a passer rating of 84.7. He had eight 300+ yard passing games, breaking a record he'd tied the previous season. Fouts was voted a 2nd-team All-Pro, and made his second Pro Bowl. Jefferson, Winslow and Joiner, his leading receivers, dominated the receiving yardage charts, finishing 1st, 2nd and 4th respectively, with over 1,100 yards each. Jefferson led the league in touchdown catches, and Winslow came top in receptions. They were the first trio of teammates to each have 1,000 receiving yards in the same season. Joiner said of Fouts at this point, "Dan has definitely matured over the last four years. His quickness of release is better, he's improved at reading defenses, he's better at going to the receiver who's open."

San Diego was again the No. 1 seed in the AFC playoffs, and hosted the Buffalo Bills in the Divisional Playoffs. The Chargers trailed 14–3 early in the game, and 14–13 with a little over two minutes to play, facing a 3rd and 10 at midfield. Fouts then found little-used wide receiver Ron Smith for what would prove to be the game-winning touchdown. Fouts finished 22 of 37, for 314 yards, 1 touchdown and 2 interceptions. Jefferson and Joiner were among those praising his leadership and toughness after the come-from-behind win. The following week, San Diego hosted Oakland for their third meeting of the season, with a place in the Super Bowl at stake. Fouts had a mixed first half, as he threw two touchdown passes to Joiner and two red zone interceptions. Joiner's second touchdown began a comeback attempt from 28–7 behind that eventually fell short; Oakland won 34–27, and went on to triumph in Super Bowl XV. Fouts finished the game having completed 22 of 45 passes for 336 yards, 2 touchdowns and 2 interceptions.

1981 season 
While San Diego won their third consecutive division title in 1981, they had to contend with early-season unrest, with both Jefferson and key defensive end Fred Dean holding out for better pay. Both players were traded early in the season, to the disapproval of numerous other Chargers. Jefferson's replacement, Wes Chandler, had made one Pro Bowl with the New Orleans Saints, and would go on to make three more with the Chargers. Without Dean, the defense slipped from 6th to 27th in the 28-team league, leaving Fouts and the offense as the unit more likely to lead San Diego to victories.

Fouts began the season by posting a near-perfect passer rating of 157.1, completing 19 of 25 for 330 yards, 3 touchdowns and no interceptions in an easy 44–14 win over Cleveland. The Chargers reached a 6–3 record before back to back one-sided defeats left them two games off the division lead. In Week 12, the Chargers went to Oakland and beat the defending Super Bowl champions 55–21. Fouts threw touchdown passes on six consecutive drives, including four to Winslow in a ten minute-period sandwiching halftime. The six touchdown passes were the most of Fouts's career, and remain a Chargers record . The win was the first of four over the final five weeks of the regular season, as the Chargers recovered to take the division title on tiebreakers over Denver, with a 10–6 record.

Fouts was consistent, passing for between 252 and 352 yards in every regular season game bar the finale. With 4,802 yards (nearly 900 yards ahead of his nearest rival), he broke the single-season record for the 3rd consecutive season, as well as breaking the records for yards per game (300.1), attempts (609) and completions (360) for the second time. He posted the best touchdown to interception ratio of his career (33–17), led the league in touchdown passes for the first time, and made his third Pro Bowl. At this point, Fouts was responsible for over half of the five 4,000-yard passing seasons in NFL history, posting his third in a row. Fouts again had three 1,000-yard receivers, with Joiner, Chandler (including his yards with the Saints before he was traded) and Winslow (again the league's leader in receptions) all crossing the mark. He benefitted from a stable, veteran offensive line (Billy Shields, Doug Wilkerson, Don Macek, Ed White and Russ Washington), who enabled Fouts to be sacked on a career-low 3% of his pass attempts.

San Diego faced the Dolphins in the Divisional Playoffs, winning the Epic in Miami 41–38. In a dominant 1st quarter, the Chargers led 24–0 when Fouts threw an 8-yard touchdown pass to James Brooks. Miami scored 24 points of their own to tie the score in the 3rd quarter, before Fouts restored the lead with a 25-yard touchdown to Winslow. The Dolphins responded with the next 14 points, and were close to scoring again when they lost a fumble at the San Diego 18 with five minutes to play. Fouts completed 7 of 8 passes for 75 yards on the ensuing drive, ending with a 9-yard touchdown pass that was intended for Winslow but caught instead by Brooks, with 58 seconds to play. The game went into overtime, where Fouts completed back-to-back passes of 20 yards to Chandler and 39 yards to Joiner, and Benirschke won the game with a 29-yard field goal nearly 14 minutes into the extra period. Fouts, who described the game as the best he'd ever played in, finished with 33 completions from 53 attempts for 433 yards (all setting new NFL playoff records), with 3 touchdowns and 1 interception. The Epic in Miami set playoff records for the most combined points, yards, passing yards and completions, and is widely considered one of the greatest NFL games played.

The Chargers faced the Bengals in Cincinnati in the AFC Championship Game. Fouts struggled to grip the ball, completing 15 of 28 passes for 185 yards, 1 touchdown and 2 interceptions as the Chargers were defeated 27–7, missing out on a Super Bowl appearance by one game for the second consecutive season.

1982 season 

In 1982, the Chargers started 1–1 before an NFL players strike interrupted the regular season, and reduced it to nine games in total when it resumed in November. Fouts did not support the strike action before it began, but trained extensively with his teammates while it was ongoing.

When play resumed, the Chargers lost their first game back, then won their next two going into a road meeting with the defending Super Bowl champion 49ers. In a passing duel with Joe Montana, Fouts threw five touchdowns, including a game-winner to running back Chuck Muncie with three minutes left. The Chargers won 41–37; Fouts finished with 33 completions from 48 attempts, for 444 yards (tying his career high), 5 touchdowns and no interceptions. The teams set an NFL record with 65 completions, while combining for 810 passing yards. The following week, San Diego faced the other participant from the previous Super Bowl, beating Cincinnati 50–34 at Jack Murphy Stadium. Fouts went 25 of 40 for 435 yards, 1 touchdown and 2 interceptions. He become the first player in NFL history to post back-to-back 400-yard games. The teams combined for 66 completions, breaking the NFL record set in the Chargers' previous game, and 883 passing yards, setting a new record. The Chargers eventually qualified for the playoffs for the fourth straight year, with a 6–3 record.

While the truncated season prevented Fouts from again breaking the passing yardage record in 1982, he did set a new yards per game record for the third consecutive year, this time with 320.3 per game. He led the league in passing yards (2,883), touchdowns (17, tied with Montana), and yards per attempt (8.7, which would prove to be the best of his career). His passer rating of 93.3, second-best in the league, would stand as a career-high, and he was named 1st-team All-Pro for the second time, as well as being voted to a fourth successive Pro Bowl. Fouts won the Associated Press Offensive Player of the Year Award with 43 of the available 80 votes, but finished runner-up in NFL MVP voting with 33, two behind Washington kicker Mark Moseley. He did win a league MVP award from the PFWA, as well as the player-awarded Jim Thorpe Trophy. Fouts was again well protected by the same quintet of offensive linemen as the previous year. This time, none of the five missed a game, and Fouts was sacked on 3.5% of pass plays. From Fouts' receivers, Winslow caught the second-most passes in the league, while Chandler, despite missing a game, finished as the only 1,000-yard receiver in the league.

San Diego traveled to Pittsburgh in the first round of the playoffs. The Steelers led 28–17 in the final quarter, but Fouts finished consecutive drives with touchdown passes to Winslow, the first coming on 4th down, the second with one minute to play. These were enough to give the Chargers a 31–28 victory. Fouts completed 27 of 43 passes for 333 yards, 3 touchdowns and no interceptions, producing a passer rating of 112.5, his best in a playoff game. In the second round of the playoffs, the Chargers faced the Dolphins in the Orange Bowl, the same venue as their famous match from the previous season. The rematch proved to be one-sided, with Miami winning 34–13. Fouts completed 15 of 34 passes for 191 yards, 1 touchdown and 5 interceptions. This proved to be the last playoff game of his career, meaning that he had thrown five interceptions in both his first and final playoff games.

Later seasons 
Fouts was a free agent in 1983. While negotiating with the Chargers, he also considered an offer to play for a proposed San Diego-based franchise in the new USFL. Ultimately, Fouts opted to sign a six-year contract with the Chargers, stating that he wanted to win a Super Bowl. The contract was reported to pay upward of $1 million per year, making it one of the most lucrative in pro football. Fouts played for five more seasons, but missed time through injury in each of those, and would not return to the playoffs.

In 1983, the Chargers went 6–10 while conceding the most points in the league. Fouts started the first seven games, throwing for at least 300 yards in five of them, but was kept out of the next five by a shoulder injury, ending a run of consecutive starts that stretched back to 1978. After returning for three games, Fouts reaggravated the injury and missed the finale. He went 5–5 as a starter, led the league in yards per game for the fifth straight year with 297.5, and made his fifth straight Pro Bowl. He threw 20 touchdowns and 15 interceptions and produced a career-high 8.8 yards per attempt, while his completion percentage (63.2%) and passer rating (92.5) were both the second best marks of his career.

San Diego started 4–2 in 1984, but faded from that point, finishing 7–9. Fouts had his fourth career 400-yard game in a Week 8 loss to the Raiders. In Week 12, he set career highs for attempts and completions, going 37 of 56 for 380 yards, 4 touchdowns and 1 interception while leading the Chargers back from a 28–14 4th quarter deficit to a 34–28 overtime upset of Dan Marino and the previously unbeaten Miami Dolphins. Fouts started the first thirteen games of the season, before injuring his groin and missing the remaining three. He went 6–7 as a starter, with 19 touchdowns and 17 interceptions. His yards per attempt slipped to 7.4, while his passer rating of 83.4 was his worst since 1979. Fouts still averaged 287.7 yards per game, but was eclipsed by Marino, who surpassed Fouts' single-season record with 5,084 passing yards and his run of five straight Pro Bowl appearances came to an end.

In 1985, the Chargers finished 8–8. The contrast between their offense and defense was stark, as they led the league in points scored, yards gained, first downs, passing yards and passing touchdowns, but were last in yards conceded, first downs conceded and passing yards conceded. As a result, Fouts took part in numerous high-scoring shootouts. In Week 2, he threw for 440 yards and 4 touchdowns; his backup Mark Herrmann added a further touchdown pass, but Seattle had 5 of their own and won 49–35. The following week, Fouts passed for 344 yards and a further 4 touchdown, which was enough for a 44–41 win over Cincinnati. Fouts was knocked out of a Week 4 game in Cleveland with knee ligament damage, and underwent arthroscopic surgery to repair it. On his third start after returning, Fouts threw for 436 yards and 4 touchdowns in a 40–34 overtime win against the Raiders. It was the sixth 400-yard game of his career, a new NFL record. Fouts started the final game on the bench with a cracked fibula, though he did have a one-play cameo appearance, coming on to hand the ball off while Herrmann was winded. Fouts went 7–5 as a starter. Despite throwing no passes in his final appearance, he topped the league in yards per game for the sixth time in his career, with 259.9. His yards per attempt rebounded to 8.5, and he led the league in that category for the third time. He posted the best touchdown percentage in the league for the only time in his career, with 6.3% of his passes going for touchdowns. His touchdowns to interceptions ratio (27–20) and passer rating (88.1) were both improved after the previous year, and he earned a sixth Pro Bowl berth, as well as 2nd-Team All-Pro honors. Fouts nearly had three 1,000 receivers again, as Chandler and running back Lionel James both reached the mark, while Joiner was short by 68 yards.

1986 began well for the Chargers, who defeated Miami 50–28, with Fouts throwing 3 touchdowns and no interceptions. This was to prove both the last 3-touchdown game of Fouts' career, and the last win of the Don Coryell era. The Chargers lost their next seven games, with Fouts throwing 6 touchdowns and 19 interceptions before being sidelined by a pair of concussions. Coryell, who had been expected to stand down at the end of the season, instead announced his resignation on October 29, amid rumors that he had been pressured into the decision. Assistant coach Al Saunders was promoted to take his place. Fouts missed three games due to the concussions, and one more with a sore shoulder; he finished the season 3–9 as a starter, and saw a major drop in statistical performance. His touchdown total was less than his interception total (16–22) for the first time since 1977, his completion percentage of 58.6% was his worst since 1976, and his passer rating dropped to 71.4, his worst since 1975 and below the NFL average of 74.1.

1987: Final season and retirement 

Fouts played one full season after Coryell's resignation. He entered 1987 without his longest serving receiver, Joiner retiring as the record-holder in career receptions and yards. The Chargers lost their first game and won their second before the season was interrupted by a players' strike, which caused the Week 3 games to be canceled and the following three weeks to feature teams made up largely of replacement players. While Fouts was not part of the players union and did not picket with his teammates, he nonetheless refused to play for the Chargers while the strike was ongoing, noting that he would be risking injury behind an inexperienced offensive line. The replacement Chargers won all three of their games, meaning that Fouts and the other regulars came back to a 4–1 team, standing atop the AFC West.

In his first game back, Fouts completed 24 of 34 for 293 yards, 2 touchdowns and no interceptions as San Diego beat the Chiefs 42–21. Three narrow victories followed, and the Chargers had a league-best 8–1 record. However, they lost all six of their remaining games while scoring only five offensive touchdowns, and missed the playoffs. Fouts played only briefly in the first of these defeats due to a calf injury, and missed the finale with a slightly torn rotator cuff. His 254th and final touchdown pass came in Week 14, a 15-yarder to James in the final quarter of a 20–16 loss to Pittsburgh, while posting his 51st and final 300-yard game, a record at the time and almost double the next highest. The following week, he played his final game, a 20–7 home defeat to the Indianapolis Colts. Fouts completed 22 of 37 passes for 257 yards, no touchdowns and 3 interceptions. He scored the only Chargers touchdown of the game himself, on a 1-yard run.

Statistically, Fouts had a similar campaign to the previous year. He was 5–5 as a starter, throwing 10 touchdowns and 15 interceptions, while his passer rating dropped slightly to 70.0. He was sacked significantly more frequently, with 24 sacks occurring on 6.2% of pass attempts, his highest percentage since 1977.

Fouts announced his retirement on March 24, 1988, at his home in Rancho Santa Fe. He cited the wear and tear on his body as the main reason. He was 36 years old at the time, and second only to Fran Tarkenton in terms of NFL career passing yards, trailing by about 4,000 yards despite attempting 863 fewer passes. Fouts ranked fourth in career passing touchdowns with 254. Reflecting on his career, he said, "We had so much confidence in what we were doing and we had a lot of fun."

Legacy and playing style 

Fouts threw for 43,040 yards and 254 touchdowns while starting 171 games over fifteen seasons in San Diego. He rushed for 476 yards and 13 touchdowns. The Chargers retired his No. 14 jersey during a ceremony at Jack Murphy Stadium on November 27, 1988, during halftime of a game against San Francisco. At the time, he was the only Charger to have his number retired. At the time of his retirement, Fouts was credited with 42 team records, as well as seven league records. San Diego found Fouts difficult to replace, as they made 14 quarterback changes in barely five seasons before settling on Stan Humphries as a long-term starter. Several of Fouts' club records lasted well into the 21st century: Philip Rivers broke his career passing touchdowns record in 2015 and career passing yardage record in 2016, while Justin Herbert surpassed Fouts' 1981 single season passing yardage record 40 years later with the benefit of one extra regular season game.

While he played five full seasons before the arrival of Coryell in San Diego, and a further one after he left, Fouts is primarily remembered as the quarterback of the Air Coryell offense, which led the league in passing yards seven times in an eight season span (1978–1983, 1985). When Fouts was inducted into the Pro Football Hall of Fame in 1993, he chose Coryell to present him, and stated during his acceptance speech that he would not have become a Hall of Fame quarterback without his former coach.

Coryell described Fouts as a superior quarterback, writing "He had quick feet and could get back and make decisions. He wasn't afraid to pull the trigger and let the ball go." Fouts was able to make up to five reads before deciding on a pass target. Bill Walsh, who went on to be a Hall of Fame head coach after leaving San Diego, said "Dan Fouts had a cool, steel-like nerve and courage ... He took a lot of beatings, a lot of pounding, but continued to play, hurt or otherwise. He played more physical football than anybody on his team, including the linebackers". Fouts rarely used the shotgun, feeling more able to read defenses at the line. After taking the snap, he would drop back a shorter distance than most quarterbacks and often delay until the last second to give his receivers time to get open, tendencies that led him to take a number of hits throughout his career.

Despite going to the playoffs from 1979 through 1982 and playing in two AFC Championship Games, the Chargers never went to the Super Bowl under Fouts. He frequently appears on lists of the best quarterbacks not to win a Super Bowl or play in one. The San Diego defense was often blamed for their defeats. While Fouts' offense remained consistently strong under Coryell, leading the league in total yardage five times in eight seasons from 1978–1985, the defense dropped from 6th in 1980 to 27th in 1981, and remained in the bottom five for the next four seasons. This slump coincided with the trade of Dean, an All-Pro sack specialist, to the San Francisco 49ers in a contract dispute. Dean would win UPI NFC Defensive Player of the Year (while playing in only 11 games) that year en route to a Super Bowl victory and help the 49ers to another Super Bowl title three years later, and later be inducted into the Hall of Fame. "I can't say how much it affected us, because we did make it to the AFC championship game," said Chargers' All-Pro defensive lineman Gary "Big Hands" Johnson of the loss of Dean. "But I could say if we had more pass rush from the corner, it might've been different." U-T San Diego in 2013 called the trade "perhaps the biggest blunder in franchise history."

NFL career statistics

Accomplishments

Honors 

Fouts' jersey number 14 retired by the Chargers in 1988. At the time, he was the only Charger to have his number retired.

He has been inducted into numerous halls of fame in the years following his retirement. This began in 1989, when the San Diego Hall of Champions placed him in the Breitbard Hall of Fame, which honors San Diego's finest athletes both on and off the playing surface. In 1992, he was inducted into the University of Oregon Hall of Fame as one of the inaugural class, then the State of Oregon Sports Hall of Fame. Fouts was enshrined into the Pro Football Hall of Fame in 1993, his first year of eligibility. Later that year, he was inducted into the Chargers Hall of Fame, together with Joiner.

Fouts was named the 2nd-team quarterback for the NFL 1980s All-Decade Team in 1990, receiving 1 full vote out of 26. In 1999, he was ranked number 92 on The Sporting News list of the 100 Greatest Football Players. He was one of the twenty quarterbacks listed as finalists for the NFL 100th Anniversary All-Time Team, though he was not among the ten who made the team. In 2009, Fouts was named by fans as the "Greatest Charger Of All Time" in voting for the Chargers 50th anniversary team.

NFL records 
Following are NFL records set by Fouts, both active records and those since broke. Records highlighted in gold are still standing. Note that the succeeding record holder may not be the current holder.

Chargers records 
Following are Chargers franchise records held by Fouts:
 Passing yards per game, season: 320.3 (1982)
 Passing touchdowns, game: 6 (11/22/81 vs. Oakland)
 Passer rating, game (min 15 attempts): 158.3 (9/26/76 vs. St. Louis)
 Passing touchdowns, playoff game: 3 (twice, tied with Philip Rivers)
 Passing yards, playoff game: 433 (1/2/82 vs. Miami, also 2nd, 3rd and 4th places with 336 and 333 (twice))
 Passing attempts, playoff game: 53 (1/2/82 vs. Miami)
 Completions, playoff game: 33 (1/2/82 vs. Miami)
 Interceptions, career: 242

Broadcasting

Television 
While announcing his retirement, Fouts stated his desire to work as a commentator, starting from the upcoming 1988 season. He did an audition tape for CBS, working with Dick Stockton, and officially joined the NFL on CBS team as an analyst in March of that year. Over the course of the next six seasons, he was primarily partnered with Verne Lundquist. CBS were outbid by Fox and lost their NFL coverage rights in 1994. Fouts then switched to the CBS-affiliated KPIX-TV in his hometown of San Francisco, where he worked as the sports director and a sports anchor. In the fall of 1997, Fouts returned to network television as an analyst, this time working college football games for ABC Sports alongside play-by-play man Brent Musburger.

In 2000, Fouts moved into a commentary role on ABC's Monday Night Football, alongside MNF anchor Al Michaels and comedian Dennis Miller. He had a three-year contract, but ABC dropped both Fouts and Miller from the show in 2002, after only two seasons. Fouts stayed with ABC, returning to college football and working alongside acclaimed veteran announcer Keith Jackson. After Jackson's retirement from ABC in 2006, Fouts partnered with Tim Brant.

ABC declined to renew the contracts of either Fouts or Brant in 2008. It was reported in USA Today later that year that Fouts was returning to CBS for NFL games, where he would work with a variety of play-by-play announcers including Don Criqui, Bill Macatee and Dick Enberg. In 2009, he was moved to partner with Enberg as the number 3 broadcasting team for the NFL on CBS. Ian Eagle replaced Enberg as Fouts' partner the following season, and the new pair remained in the number three slot until 2014, when they were elevated to the number two team behind Jim Nantz and Phil Simms (and later, Tony Romo). Fouts and Eagle were often called "The Bird and the Beard". While with CBS, Fouts also covered Chargers preseason games carried throughout Southern California.

In April 2020 it was announced that CBS had parted ways with Fouts.

Other media 

In 1998, Fouts made his big-screen debut, portraying himself in the football comedy The Waterboy, starring Adam Sandler. Fouts and Musburger appeared late in the film as ABC Sports' broadcast team for the fictitious New Year's Day "Bourbon Bowl" game.

Fouts did color commentary for the football video game NFL GameDay 2004, released in 2003. He partnered with long-time announcer Enberg.

During his second stint at CBS, Fouts also called NFL games for Westwood One radio, including Super Bowl 50.

Life outside football 
Fouts married his first wife, public health major Julianne Mehl, in 1977. The pair had met at the University of Oregon. They later divorced, and Fouts was married for the second time in 1994, to Jeri Martin. He had two children from the first marriage and two from the second. His first son Dominic died of cancer in 2012. The family set up the Dominic Fouts Memorial Cancer Fund, with Dan Fouts as an adviser.

He lives with his wife in Oregon, the state of his alma mater, in a two-story home he had constructed from logs in the 1970s. The house is situated in the mountains near Sisters.

Described as a private person away from football, Fouts enjoyed fishing, skiing and racquetball during his playing career. He is also a keen golfer, who has appeared at numerous charity events.

See also 
 Bay Area Sports Hall of Fame
 List of National Football League annual pass completion percentage leaders

Notes

References

External links 

 
 
 Pro Football Hall of Fame: Member profile

1951 births
Living people
American atheists
American Conference Pro Bowl players
American football quarterbacks
College football announcers
National Football League announcers
National Football League Offensive Player of the Year Award winners
National Football League players with retired numbers
Oregon Ducks football players
People from Sisters, Oregon
Players of American football from San Francisco
Pro Football Hall of Fame inductees
San Diego Chargers players